The Merry Frinks is a 1934 American comedy film directed by Alfred E. Green and starring Aline MacMahon, Guy Kibbee and Hugh Herbert. It is also known by the alternative title of Happy Family.

Synopsis
A put-upon mother inherits a fortune, on the condition that she abandon her deadbeat family. This spurs her family members to attempt to reform themselves in an effort to win her back.

Cast
 Aline MacMahon as Hattie 'Mom' Frink  
 Guy Kibbee as Uncle Newt Frink  
 Hugh Herbert as Joe 'Poppa' Frink 
 Allen Jenkins as Emmett Frink  
 Helen Lowell as Amelia 'Grandma' Frink  
 Joan Wheeler as Lucille Frink  
 Frankie Darro as Norman Frink  
 Ivan Lebedeff as Ramon Alvarez  
 Harold Huber as Benny Lopez  
 Louise Beavers as Camille, Hattie's Maid  
 Maidel Turner as Mrs. Shinliver  
 Harry Beresford as Mr. J. Harold Brumby  
 Harry C. Bradley as Dr. Shinliver  
 James Bush as Oliver Gilfin  
 Charles Coleman as Witherspoon, Hattie's Butler  
 Joan Sheldon as Frieda Shinliver 
 Ethel Wales as United Charities Worker  
 Edward Keane as Truant Officer 
 Ivan Linow as Barkefky, the First Russian 
 Michael Visaroff as Katzelmalov, the Second Russian

References

Bibliography
 Hanson, Philip. This Side of Despair: How the Movies and American Life Intersected During the Great Depression. Associated University Presse, 2008.

External links
 
 
 
 

1934 films
1934 comedy films
American comedy films
Films directed by Alfred E. Green
American black-and-white films
Warner Bros. films
Films with screenplays by Kathryn Scola
1930s English-language films
1930s American films
Films scored by Bernhard Kaun
Films about inheritances